My Friends is a studio album by The Wailers Band, a reggae band. It was released in 1997 under the Melting Pop label.

Tracks
Could You Be Loved/It's Your Thing/Unite
My Friend
Dancing Boys
War/No More Trouble
Bad Mind People
Running Away/Crazy Baldhead/Rastafari
Get Up Stand Up
Jah Live
Natural Mystic
Roots Rock Reggae
Irie

1997 albums
The Wailers Band albums